The 2003 Casablanca bombings were a series of suicide bombings on May 16, 2003, in Casablanca, Morocco. The attacks were the deadliest terrorist attacks in the country's history. Forty-five people were killed in the attacks (33 victims and 12 suicide bombers). The suicide bombers came from the shanty towns of Sidi Moumen, a poor suburb of Casablanca. That same year, Adil Charkaoui, a Casablanca-based resident who was issued a Security Certificate in Montreal, Canada, was charged with supporting terrorism, and rumours allege he may have played a financial role in the bombings.

Bombings
The 14 bombers, most of whom were between 20 and 23 years old, bombed four places on the night of May 16, 2003. In the deadliest attack, bombers wearing explosives knifed a guard at the "Casa de España" restaurant, a Spanish-owned eatery in the city. They blew themselves up inside the building, killing 20 people, many of them Muslims dining and playing bingo.

The five-star  was bombed next, killing a guard and a porter. Another bomber killed three passersby as he attempted to bomb a Jewish cemetery. Two additional bombers attacked a Jewish community center, but killed no one because the building was closed and empty. It would have been packed the next day.

Another bomber attacked a Jewish-owned Italian restaurant, and another blew up near the Belgian consulate which is located meters away from the restaurant, killing two police officers.

In all, 33 civilians and 2 police officers were killed, along with 12 bombers. Two bombers were arrested before they could carry out attacks. More than 100 people were injured; 97 of them were Muslims. Eight of the dead were Europeans and the rest were Moroccan.

Response
A large demonstration was organized through the streets of Casablanca. Tens of thousands marched, carrying banners such as "Say No to Terrorism".  They shouted "Down with Hate" and "United against Terrorism".
 
Mohammed VI, the King of Morocco, toured the bombing sites and was cheered by crowds of people. Moroccan authorities said  in May 2004 that they had arrested 2,000 people in connection with the attacks, and began to put them on trial.

World leaders condemned the attacks, coming four days after the Riyadh compound bombings. In response to that attack and the Casablanca attacks, the U.S. Department of Homeland Security raised the terror threat level to Orange.

Salafia Jihadia, an offshoot of the Moroccan Islamic Combatant Group and believed to have al-Qaeda links, is suspected of sending out the bombers. On March 19, 2004, Belgian police arrested a suspect wanted by the Moroccan government in connection with the bombings. In December 2004, a man named Hasan al-Haski, charged in the 2004 Madrid bombings, was questioned over his links to the Casablanca bombings and was suspected to have helped plan them.

Abu Musab al-Zarqawi was believed to have ordered the bombings. He was killed in an airstrike on June 7, 2006.

A number of Muslims were subsequently convicted of bombings. In April 2008 nine of the prisoners tunneled their way out of prison. Abderrahim Mahtade, who represents a prisoners’ advocacy group, said the fugitives had escaped from the Kenitra prison, north of Rabat, after dawn prayers. He said one of the nine had been sentenced to death, six to life imprisonment and two to 20 years.

Saad bin Laden was suspected of direct involvement in the bombings. However, he was under house arrest in Iran at the time and did not escape until 2008. He was killed in a drone strike in Pakistan in 2009.

Hassan al-Kattani, having been convicted of inspiring the attacks in 2003, was pardoned in 2011 after several hunger strikes and criticisms from human rights groups who alleged that Kattani was innocent. Omar al-Haddouchi was also jailed for inspiring the bombings and pardoned in 2011.

See also
1907 Bombardment of Casablanca
2007 Casablanca bombings
 Horses of God – 2012 semi-fictional film about the bombers

References

External links
Analysis: Casablanca bombings (PDF)
ERRI Briefing with description of attack
Terror blasts rock Casablanca – BBC
Moroccans march against terror - BBC

2003 crimes in Morocco
2003 murders in Africa
2000s murders in Morocco
21st-century attacks on synagogues and Jewish communal organizations
21st century in Casablanca
21st-century mass murder in Africa
Antisemitism in Morocco
Explosions in 2003
Attacks on diplomatic missions
Attacks on hotels in Africa
Attacks on restaurants in Africa
Building bombings in Africa
Hotel bombings
Islam and antisemitism
Islamic terrorism in Morocco
Islamic terrorist incidents in 2003
Jewish Moroccan history
Jews and Judaism in Casablanca
Mass murder in 2003
Mass murder in Africa
May 2003 crimes
Suicide bombings in Morocco
Terrorist incidents in Morocco in 2003